Pachyerannis is a monotypic moth genus in the family Geometridae described by Inoue in 1982. Its only species, Pachyerannis obliquaria, first described by Victor Motschulsky in 1860, is known from Japan and the Russian Far East.

The wingspan is 24–30 mm.

References

External links
"クロスジフユエダシャク Pachyerannis obliquaria (Motschulsky, 1861)". Japanese Moths.

Bistonini
Monotypic moth genera
Moths of Japan